Mir iskusstva (World of Art) was a Russian magazine and the artistic movement it inspired and embodied, which was a major influence on the Russians who helped revolutionize European art during the first decade of the 20th century. The magazine had limited circulation outside Russia.

From 1909, several of the miriskusniki (i.e., members of the movement) also participated in productions of Sergei Diaghilev's Ballets Russes company based in Paris.

Foundation
The artistic group was founded in November 1898 by a group of students that included Alexandre Benois, Konstantin Somov, Dmitry Filosofov, Léon Bakst, and Eugene Lansere. The starting moments for the new artistic group was organization of the Exhibition of Russian and Finnish Artists in the Stieglitz Museum of Applied Arts in Saint-Petersburg.

The magazine was co-founded in 1899 in St. Petersburg by Alexandre Benois, Léon Bakst, and Sergei Diaghilev (the Chief Editor). They aimed at assailing artistic standards of the obsolescent Peredvizhniki school and promoting artistic individualism and other principles of Art Nouveau. The theoretical declarations of the art movements were stated in Diaghilev's articles "Difficult Questions", "Our Imaginary Degradation", "Permanent Struggle", "In Search of Beauty", and "The Fundamentals of Artistic Appreciation" published in the N1/2 and N3/4 of the new journal.

Classical period

In its "classical period" (1898-1904) the art group organized six exhibitions: 1899 (International), 1900, 1901 (At the Imperial Academy of Arts, Saint Petersburg), 1902 (Moscow and Saint Petersburg), 1903, 1906 (Saint Petersburg). The sixth exhibition was seen as a Diaghilev's attempt to prevent the separation from the Moscow members of the group who organized a separate "Exhibition of 36 artists" (1901) and later "The Union of Russian Artists" group (from 1903). The magazine ended in 1904.

In 1904-1910, Mir iskusstva did not exist as a separate artistic group. Its place was inherited by the Union of Russian Artists which continued officially until 1910 and unofficially until 1924. The Union included painters (Valentin Serov, Konstantin Korovin, Boris Kustodiev, Zinaida Serebriakova, Sergei Lednev-Schukin), illustrators (Ivan Bilibin, Konstantin Somov, Dmitry Mitrohin), restorators (Igor Grabar), and scenic designers (Nicholas Roerich, Serge Sudeikin).

In 1910 Benois published a critical article in the magazine Rech''' about the Union of Russian Artists. Mir iskusstva was recreated. Nicholas Roerich became the new chairman. The group admitted new members including Nathan Altman, Vladimir Tatlin, and Martiros Saryan. Some said that the inclusion of Russian avant-garde painters demonstrated that the group had become an exhibition organization rather than an art movement. In 1917 the chairman of the group became Ivan Bilibin. The same year most members of the Jack of Diamonds entered the group.

The group organized numerous exhibitions: 1911, 1912, 1913, 1915, 1916, 1917, 1918, 1921, 1922 Saint-Petersburg, Moscow). The last exhibition of Mir iskusstva was organized in Paris in 1927.

Art

Like the English Pre-Raphaelites before them, Benois and his friends were disgusted with anti-aesthetic nature of modern industrial society and sought to consolidate all Neo-Romantic Russian artists under the banner of fighting Positivism in art.

Like the Romantics before them, the miriskusniki promoted understanding and conservation of the art of previous epochs, particularly traditional folk art and the 18th-century rococo. Antoine Watteau was probably the single artist whom they admired the most.

Such Revivalist projects were treated by the miriskusniki humorously, in a spirit of self-parody.  They were fascinated with masks and marionettes, with carnaval and puppet theater, with dreams and fairy-tales.  Everything grotesque and playful appealed to them more than the serious and emotional.  Their favorite city was Venice, so much so that Diaghilev and Stravinsky selected it as the place of their burial.

As for media, the miriskusniki preferred the light, airy effects of watercolor and gouache to full-scale oil paintings. Seeking to bring art into every house, they often designed interiors and books. Bakst and Benois revolutionized theatrical design with their ground-breaking decor for Cléopâtre (1909), Carnaval (1910), Petrushka (1911), and L'après-midi d'un faune (1912).
Apart from three founding fathers, active members of the World of Art included Mstislav Dobuzhinsky, Eugene Lansere, and Konstantin Somov.  Exhibitions organized by the World of Art attracted many illustrious painters from Russia and abroad, notably Mikhail Vrubel, Mikhail Nesterov, and Isaac Levitan.

In 1902 Benois and 'Mir Iskusstva' established a publishing house. They created postcards with reproductions of art masterpieces, 'educational' postcards with short commentaries and pictures from different fields of science (geography, zoology, etc.). However, the demand was rather low. Only the scenery and landscapes were sold in large runs, by 1909 the publishing house started printing books. They published guide-books on Pavlovsk, St Petersburg, Hermitage Museum, an exquisite edition of The Bronze Horseman with illustrations by Benois and many more.

Gallery

References

Literature
Hanna Chuchvaha, Art Periodical Culture in Late Imperial Russia (1898-1917). Print Modernism in Transition (Boston & Leiden: Brill, 2016) 

Janet Kennedy, The Mir Iskusstva Group and Russian Art 1898-1912'' (New York: Garland, 1977)

1898 establishments in the Russian Empire
Russian symbolism